Stephen Charles Jacobsen (1940–2016) was an American bioengineer, a pioneer in his field, specifically in developing medical devices and tools, including an artificial kidney and an exoskeleton, and was Distinguished Professor at University of Utah. He was a Fellow of the National Academy of Engineering and Institute of Medicine.

Jacobsen founded Sarcos, a technological company producing robots and microelectromechanical systems, in 1983.

References

1940 births
2016 deaths
University of Utah faculty
American bioengineers
American roboticists
Scientists from Salt Lake City
Businesspeople from Salt Lake City
Members of the United States National Academy of Engineering
University of Utah alumni
Massachusetts Institute of Technology alumni
Members of the National Academy of Medicine
20th-century American businesspeople